Mazzacurati is a family name of Italian origin. It may refer to: 

 Carlo Mazzacurati, Italian  film director and screenwriter
 Mario Mazzacurati (1903–1985), Italian engineer and auto racer driver
 Renato Marino Mazzacurati, Italian painter and sculptor
 Rosy Mazzacurati, Italian film and stage actress

Italian-language surnames